Carlos Federico Arias Ortiz is a Mexican biochemist specialized in rotaviri. Along his wife, Susana López Charretón, he has been a co-recipient of both the 2001 Carlos J. Finlay Prize for Microbiology and the 2008 TWAS Prize in Biology.

Arias Ortiz holds a bachelor's degree in Pharmacology and both a master's and a doctorate degree in basic biomedical research from the National Autonomous University of Mexico (UNAM). Currently, he works for the Institute of Biotechnology of the same university.

From 1991 to 2006 he was a Howard Hughes Medical Institute International Research Scholar.

See also 
List of people from Morelos, Mexico

External links 
 Profile at the Howard Hughes Medical Institute
 Personal web page at the Institute of Biotechnology – UNAM (in Spanish).

References 

Mexican biochemists
Members of the Mexican Academy of Sciences
National Autonomous University of Mexico alumni
Academic staff of the National Autonomous University of Mexico
Living people
Year of birth missing (living people)
People from Cuernavaca
TWAS laureates
21st-century Mexican scientists
20th-century Mexican scientists